Flavien Ranaivo (Arivonimamo, 13 May 1914 - Troyes 20 December 1999) was a Malagasy poet and journalist.

Life
His family was noble, and he spent most of his life in contact with nature. His works are influenced by Malagasy ballad and song forms, in particular the hain-teny. Ranaivo also held important civic and government posts.

Works
 L'ombre et le vent (1947)
 Mes chansons de toujours (1955) 
 Le retour au bercail (1962)
 Littérature magache (1956)
 Images de Madagascar (1968)

References

1914 births
1999 deaths
Malagasy journalists
20th-century Malagasy poets
Malagasy emigrants to France